Thailand's women's national rugby sevens team competes at the Asian Games and other sevens tournaments. They competed at the 2009 Rugby World Cup Sevens and were bronze medalists at the 2010 Asian Games. At the 2018 Asian Games, they reached the semifinals but were beaten by China 29 - 5. They lost to Kazakhstan in the bronze medal final and finished in fourth place.

Tournament history

Rugby World Cup Sevens

Asian Games

Players

Previous Squads

References

Thailand national rugby union team
Asian national women's rugby union teams
Women's national rugby sevens teams